Strada dell'olio is a kind of gastronomical route in Italy that crosses a territory rich of traditional products, PDOs and PGIs, DOCs and DOCGs in Italy. It is sometimes linked to an enological tour.

This kind of route aims to promote Italian products of excellence in the agricultural field and in food industry, with a special focus on PDO olive oils. Usually it includes frantoi (olive presses), rural hamlets, medieval villages, Reinassance cities, archeological sites, ancient and modern production farms, and thermal locations.

The route may include cultural and landscape's paths in the PDO production areas, often very interesting from an archeological, historical, artistic, point of view. Special parks allow kids to learn by playing; along food-oil-and-wine paths can be found restaurants, farm stays and suggestions to enjoy good food and great locations.
Strade dell'olio are often situated in or nearby UNESCO areas and places renowned worldwide for the production of high quality wines, cheese and, obviously, oil and olives.

Strade dell'olio are often related to wellness tours, for the numerous thermal areas within DOP production territories.

PDO Italian Oils and Strade dell'olio

See also
Appellation
Country of origin
European Union Common Agricultural Policy
Genericized trademark
Geographical indication
Italian cuisine
Italian wines
List of geographical designations for spirit drinks in the European Union
List of Italian cheeses
List of Italian DOC wines
List of Italian DOCG wines
List of Italian products with protected designation of origin
Protected Geographical Status
Quality Wines Produced in Specified Regions (QWPSR)

External links
EU Food Quality website with access to PDO/PGI/TSG listings, europa.eu
Defra - EU Protected Food Names Scheme. defra.gov.uk
 Città dell'olio association of municipalities (in Italian)

Italian products with protected designation of origin
Olive oil